Wamako is a Local Government Area in Sokoto State, Nigeria. Its headquarters is in the town of Wamako (or Wamakko) on the Sokoto River.

It has an area of 697 km and a population of 179,619 at the 2006 census. The concentration of wealth, prestige, the political power and religious learning centers in Wamakko attracted large numbers of rural-urban migrants, both from the neighboring state and from distance regions. Presently the ongoing projects in Wamakko are Sokoto State University, National Youth Services Corps camp (NYSC), Amusement Park. As of 2010 the research conducted by National Bureau of Statistics, the estimated rural –urban migrants in the area is about 4,536 and it's increasing at the rate of 10% annually.

Local government is mainly populated by Hausa people. It also comprises four villages: Kammata, Gwamatse, Kauran Kimaba and Kokani Cidawa. The inhabitants are mostly farmers and animal rearers but the initial inhabitants were Sulubawa but now the area were dominated by Hausa.

The postal code of the area is 840.

References

Local Government Areas in Sokoto State